The 2015–16 season was the 13th season in the history of the Scarlets, a Welsh rugby union regional side based in Llanelli, Carmarthenshire. In this season, they competed in the Pro 12 and the European Champions Cup. It was head coach Wayne Pivac's second season in charge of the region, and Stephen Jones' first season as backs coach after joining from Wasps. In addition to this, Ioan Cunningham was promoted to forwards coach after being part of Llanelli RFC and the Scarlets academy coaching team.

Pre-season and friendlies
Despite being a home game, the friendly against Bedford was played at Llandovery RFC's Church Bank instead of at Parc y Scarlets.

Pro 12

Fixtures

Table

European Champions Cup

Fixtures

Table

Statistics
(+ in the Apps column denotes substitute appearance)

Stats accurate as of match played 7 May 2016

Transfers

In

Out

References

2015-16
2015–16 Pro12 by team
2015–16 in Welsh rugby union
2015–16 European Rugby Champions Cup by team